Darling Downs Health (DDH), formally the Darling Downs Hospital and Health Service, is the local health district servicing the Darling Downs region in Queensland, Australia. Darling Downs Health forms part of Queensland Health, the state's public health service, and operates 29 facilities across 90,000 km2 throughout the region. The health service's main referral facility is Toowoomba Hospital, which provides maternity, emergency, surgical, mental health, allied health and specialist outpatient services.

Facilities 
Darling Downs Health operates 29 facilities, including hospitals, community outreach and specialist services, Multipurpose Health Services, and Residential Aged Care Facilities (RACFs). Multipurpose Health Services are co-designed facilities that serve as both the local primary care clinic, and as an emergency and visiting specialist secondary care facility. RACFs provide specialist rehabilitation and geriatric care services to patients requiring dedicated nursing and allied health care.

See also 

 Toowoomba Hospital
 Baillie Henderson Hospital
 Queensland Health

References

External links 

 
 

Darling Downs
Health
Medical and health organisations based in Queensland
Queensland